En Tol Sarmiento, also known as ETS or E.T.S, is a group of ska music which was created in Yécora/Iekora (Álava) in the year 2005. Since 2005 until nowadays, they have already given more than 200 concerts all around the Basque Country. They characterize mostly because of their rhythms, their lively songs and their powerful lives and directs. Their songs are written in Spanish or in Basque and they mention different types of topics. At first, they spoke about some social hedonistic critics. But as the time goes on, their themes are more existentialist ones. However, without leaving aside neither the social commitment nor the cheerful rhythms.

History 

This band's first work was called Vendimia Seleccionada (2008). Although, is quite difficult to find it due to the few copies they made. After some concerts around de Rioja Alavesa, the productor Baga Biga caught an eye on them and they were offer another work  (Hacia la Luna, 2012) with this company. The single of this record, named as Musikaren doinua, become fast on a big success. Besides, they continue singing it nowadays in all the Basque Country.
After been on tour (50 concerts more or less), the group edit once again another record (Zure mundua, 2014) with the company Baga Biga.
On that year live and directs, the one on Vitoria-Gasteiz and the one on Araba Euskaraz where the most emphasized with the Piztuko dugu euskara song. 
Finally, on November of the 2015 they came up with their third record, Beldurrik ez, once again with Baga Biga company.

Curiosities 
In August 2015, Spotify revealed that En Tol Sarmiento was the most listened-to group by underage people of de CAV.

Members 
 Iñigo Etxe – voice and guitar
 Rubén Campi – bass guitar
 Floren Nuela – drums
 Javier Lucas – trombone
 Rubén Terreros – trumpet

Discography 
Albums
 Vendimia seleccionada (2008)
 Hacia la luna (Baga-Biga, 2012)
 Zure mundua (Baga-Biga, 2014)
 Beldurrik ez (Baga-Biga, 2015)
 Aukeria Berriak (Baga-Biga, 2020) No. 81 Spain

References 

Ska